The 1948 Stanley Cup playoffs, the playoff tournament of the National Hockey League (NHL), began with four teams on March 4, 1948. It concluded on April 14, with the Toronto Maple Leafs defeating the Detroit Red Wings to win the Stanley Cup.

Series
All dates in 1948

Semifinals
The first round of the playoffs saw third place Boston Bruins matched up with first place Toronto Maple Leafs and fourth place New York Rangers against second place Detroit Red Wings.

Toronto vs. Boston
Toronto beat Boston 4 games to 1. Although Boston kept it close. Three of the five games were decided by one goal.

NY Rangers vs. Detroit

It looked initially to be a close series as, after the Blueshirts lost the first two games, the Wings Production line got lazy. But wingers, Ted Lindsay and Gordie Howe chose follow Lindsay's recent quote —

“In this game, you have to be mean, or you're going to get pushed around.” (Glenn Liebman, Hockey Shorts: 1,001 of the Game's Funniest One Liners" (Contemporary Books, 1996) ) —

Detroil was now pursuing Lord Stanley's Mug for the fourth time in six years.

Finals

Playoff bracket

Playoff scoring leaders
GP = Games Played, G = Goals, A = Assists, Pts = Points

See also
1947–48 NHL season
List of Stanley Cup champions

References

playoffs
Stanley Cup playoffs